Stepney Green Park is a  park in Stepney, Tower Hamlets, London. It is a remnant of a larger area of common land. It was formerly known as Mile End Green. A Crossrail construction site occupies part of the green, with Stepney Green cavern below it.

It gives its name to the surrounding neighborhood of Stepney Green.

See also 
 Stepney Green tube station

References

External links 
 

Parks and open spaces in the London Borough of Tower Hamlets
Stepney